Nicholas Murray is a British biographer, poet and journalist.

Career
Murray is a freelance author based in Wales and London.  Born in Liverpool he is the author of several literary biographies including lives of Franz Kafka, Aldous Huxley, Bruce Chatwin, Andrew Marvell and Matthew Arnold, four collections of poems, and two novels.  His biography of Matthew Arnold was a New York Times Notable Book of the Year in 1997 and his biography of Aldous Huxley was shortlisted for the Marsh Biography Award in 2003.  His biography of Franz Kafka has been translated into nine languages.

He is a regular contributor of poems, essays and reviews to a wide range of newspapers and literary magazines In 1996 he was the inaugural Gladys Krieble Delmas Fellow at the British Library Centre for the Book and he is a Fellow of the Welsh Academy and vice-chair of English PEN’s Writers in Translation Committee.  He has lectured at literary festivals and universities in Britain, Europe and the United States. From 2003-2007 he was Royal Literary Fund Fellow at Queen Mary University, London and from 2010-2011 an RLF Fellow at King's College, London.  He is a tutor in biography and creative non-fiction at the City Literary Institute in London.

So Spirited a Town: Visions and Versions of Liverpool was published by Liverpool University Press in November 2007 and a book about the British Victorian travellers and explorers, A Corkscrew is Most Useful, was published by Little, Brown in April 2008. In November 2010 his book about Bloomsbury in the “Real” series was published: Real Bloomsbury (Seren). His book about the British poets of the First World War, The Red Sweet Wine of Youth (Little, Brown) appeared in February 2011 and his verse broadside against the British coalition government, Get Real! also  appeared in February 2011.  In April 2012 Acapulco: New and Selected Poems appeared from Melos Press. His latest book is Of Earth, Water, Air and Fire: animal poems (Melos, 2013)

Murray also runs a small poetry imprint, Rack Press, and writes the Bibliophilicblogger literary blog.

In August 2015, Murray was one of 20 authors of Poets for Corbyn, an anthology of poems endorsing Jeremy Corbyn's campaign in the Labour Party leadership election.

Works
Bruce Chatwin (Seren, 1996, though Murray's website says 1996) 
Matthew Arnold
World Enough and Time: The Life of Andrew Marvell
Aldous Huxley
Franz Kafka
A Corkscrew is Most Useful: The Travellers of Empire
Real Bloomsbury
The Red Sweet Wine of Youth: The British Poets of the First World War
Remembering Carmen
A Short Book About Love
So Spirited a Town: Visions and Versions of Liverpool
Acapulco: New and Selected Poems
Bloomsbury and the Poets

References

External links
Official site
 Bibliophilic literary blog
Biography from Royal Literary Fund
Kafka, review in The Observer, 13 Jun 2004
Blog review of The Red Sweet Wine Of Youth
"A Fine and Private Man" from The Washington Post
"Tremors of Implication " from The New York Times
Real Bloomsbury blog

People educated at St Mary's College, Crosby
English biographers
Writers from Liverpool
Living people
English male journalists
English male poets
Year of birth missing (living people)
Male biographers